The following is a list of episodes from the television series, Team Galaxy.

Episode list

Season 1: 2006–2007

Season 2: 2007

Team Galaxy
Team Galaxy